The final tournament of UEFA Euro 1972 was a single-elimination tournament involving the four teams that qualified from the quarter-finals. There were two rounds of matches: a semi-final stage leading to the final to decide the champions. The final tournament began with the semi-finals on 14 June and ended with the final on 18 June at Heysel Stadium in Brussels. West Germany won the tournament with a 3–0 victory over the Soviet Union.

All times Central European Time (UTC+1)

Format
Any game in the final tournament that was undecided by the end of the regular 90 minutes was followed by thirty minutes of extra time (two 15-minute halves). If scores were still level after 30 minutes of extra time, there would be a penalty shootout (at least five penalties each, and more if necessary) to determine who progressed to the next round.

Teams

Bracket

Semi-finals

Hungary vs Soviet Union

Belgium vs West Germany

Third place play-off

Final

References

External links

 UEFA Euro 1972 official history

Knockout stage
1972
Knockout stage
Knockout stage
Knockout stage
Knockout stage
Sports competitions in Antwerp
Sports competitions in Brussels
Sport in Liège
1970s in Brussels
1970s in Antwerp